Joye is a name primarily used as a surname, but also as a given name. Notable people with the name include:

Given name
Joye Hummel (1924–2021), American comics writer
Joye Estazie (born 1984), Mauritian footballer
Soara-Joye Ross, American actress and singer

Surname
Gilles Joye (1424 or 1425–1483), Franco-Flemish composer
George Joye (c. 1495 – 1553), English Bible translator
John Joye (fl. 1584), English politician
Prudent Joye (1913–1980), French athlete
Col Joye (born 1937), Australian rock musician
Samantha Joye (born 1965), American oceanographer 
Dan Joye (born 1985), Venezuelan-American luger
Cpt. Prentice Edmond Joye Jr. (born 1946), United States Army Captain

See also
 Joy (disambiguation)
 Joyes (disambiguation)